Nobody's Daughter Haewon is a 2013 South Korean drama film written and directed by Hong Sang-soo. The narrative is told in diary format and chronicles a few days in the life of a young woman (Jung Eun-chae) who falls into depression following the departure of her mother to Canada. She falls back on a troubled affair with a professor (Lee Sun-kyun), who offers to whisk her away.

The film made its world premiere and screened in competition at the 63rd Berlin International Film Festival.

The film was selected as part of the 2013 Hong Kong International Film Festival.

It was named #8 on Cahiers du Cinéma'''s list of top films of 2013.

 Plot 
On March 21, 2012, on the way to having lunch with her mother Jin-joo (Kim Ja-ok) in Seochon (West Village), Jongno District, Seoul, film student and aspiring actress Haewon (Jung Eun-chae) bumps into French actress-singer Jane Birkin in the street and gets her autograph. Birkin says how much Haewon resembles her own daughter, Charlotte Gainsbourg, which pleases Haewon enormously. Immediately afterwards we find out that this meeting was actually a dream, one of several that Haewon is shown to have during the film. Haewon's mother is about to emigrate to Canada and stay with her brother, and asks Haewon about her future plans. Afterwards Haewon walks to Jongno Public Library, past Yoomyung-jang'' (lit. Hotel Famous) that has special memories for her. Later, in nearby Sajik Park, she meets her married ex-lover Lee Seong-joon (Lee Sun-kyun), a film director who is also her professor at college. They pass a restaurant, where they have already been spotted by his students, and decide to go in and have a meal with them. When Haewon is away from the table, the other students start gossiping about how she is not pure Korean and comes from a wealthy family.

On March 27, Haewon and Seong-joon drive to Namhan Fortress in Gwangju, Gyeonggi, where they get into an argument over how he broke up their relationship and how she had an affair with a fellow student, Jae-hong.

On April 3, Haewon falls asleep in the college library and dreams of a fellow student, Yoo-ran, asking whether she's having an affair with Seong-jun. And then, while strolling around West Village, Haewon bumps into Joong-won (Kim Eui-sung), a professor from San Diego, California, who divorced a year ago and is looking to remarry someone like her. Later, while meeting her friend Yeon-joo (Ye Ji-won) and the latter's boyfriend Joong-sik (Yoo Jun-sang) at Namhan Fortress, she tells them about the meeting. And then Seong-joon calls her, demanding to meet immediately.

Cast 
 Jung Eun-chae as Haewon
 Lee Sun-kyun as Lee Seong-joon, a professor of film studies
 Kim Ja-ok as Jin-joo, Haewon's mother
 Kim Eui-sung as Joong-won, a professor from San Diego, California
 Ye Ji-won as Yeon-joo, a friend of Haewon
 Yoo Jun-sang as Joong-sik, a boyfriend of Yeon-joo
 Gi Ju-bong as Hoo-won, a mountain climber
 Ryu Deok-hwan as Dong-joo, a bookseller
 Jane Birkin as herself
 Park Joo-hee as Student
 Ahn Jae-hong as Student 1.

Awards and nominations 
2013 Baeksang Arts Awards
Nomination - Best New Actress - Jung Eun-chae

2013 Buil Film Awards
Best New Actress - Jung Eun-chae
Nomination - Best Film
Nomination - Best Actress - Jung Eun-chae
Nomination - Best Music - Jeong Yong-jin

2013 Korean Association of Film Critics Awards
Best New Actress - Jung Eun-chae

2013 Blue Dragon Film Awards
Nomination - Best New Actress - Jung Eun-chae

2013 Busan Film Critics Awards
Best New Actress - Jung Eun-chae

2014 KOFRA  Film Awards
Best New Actress - Jung Eun-chae

2014 Wildflower Film Awards
Best Actress - Jung Eun-chae
Nomination - Best New Actor/Actress - Jung Eun-chae

References

External links 
 
 
 
 

2013 films
2013 romantic drama films
South Korean independent films
South Korean romantic drama films
Adultery in films
Films about film directors and producers
Films about educators
Films set in 2012
Films set in Seoul
Films shot in Seoul
Films directed by Hong Sang-soo
Sponge Entertainment films
2010s Korean-language films
2010s South Korean films